The 1996 Indiana Democratic presidential primary was held on May 7, 1996, in Indiana as one of the Democratic Party's statewide nomination contests ahead of the 1996 presidential election. Incumbent President Bill Clinton won the primary unopposed.

Results

References 

Indiana
1996 Indiana elections
Indiana Democratic primaries